DNS is the Domain Name System, a network system used to translate names into IP addresses.

DNS may also refer to:

Science and technology
 Deviated nasal septum, a displaced part of the nose
 3,5-Dinitrosalicylic acid, an aromatic compound
 Dinalbuphine sebacate, an analgesic
 Direct numerical simulation, a simulation method in computational fluid dynamics
 Dragon NaturallySpeaking, speech recognition software
 "Do not stuff", the omitting of a component on a printed circuit board

Other uses
 Doctor of Nursing Science, an academic research degree
 Det Nødvendige Seminarium, a teacher training college in Denmark
  (Democratic People's Alliance), a political party in Bosnia and Herzegovina
 Dinas Powys railway station (station code), Wales
 Distressed non-swimmer, a swimming victim type
 Did not start, in the glossary of motorsport terms
 DNS (retail company), an electronics retailer in Russia

See also
 Didcot, Newbury and Southampton Railway (DN&SR), an English railway 1891–1923